Mariame Kolga (born May 31, 1983) is an Ivorian female professional basketball player. She was named to the 2007 national team.

References

External links
Profile at afrobasket.com

1983 births
Living people
Sportspeople from Abidjan
Ivorian women's basketball players
Point guards
Shooting guards